Patricia Darcy Jones (April 2, 1953 – June 16, 2007) was an American rock singer, vocalist and Broadway actress.

Patty's dynamic voice led her career spanning from singing at the Paper Moon Cabaret in Greenwich Village to backup singer for Cher as well as singing with artists: Petula Clark, Joe Cocker, Billy Joel, Tom Jones, Darlene Love, Rusty Magee, Melissa Manchester, Bette Midler, Olivia Newton-John, Robert Plant, Todd Rundgren, Ronnie Spector, Styx and The Young Rascals. On November 13, 1987, she appeared on Late Night with David Letterman in the iconic reunion of "Sonny and Cher" singing "I Got You, Babe"

Personal life
Patty was one of four children born to Helen and Eugene Darcy Sr.; her siblings include: Eugene Darcy Jr., Kenneth Darcy, and Kim (Darcy) Kirsch. Patty was married to Courtney Jones, whom she met on one of Cher's tours in 1989. He used to engage Patty in casual conversation as the sound crew set up, which "snowballed itself into more of a relationship," according to Jones.

Career
1982: appeared in the movie Waitress! and sang "All Night Long" c1979 Music and Lyrics by Mark Newman and "Dancin Tonight" c.1979 Music and Lyrics by Ruth Pollack & Steve Sarabande for the soundtrack.

1985: Broadway Musical Leader of the Pack.

1986 – 1987:  Beehive, original cast, Upstairs at the Village Gate, NYC

1990: Heart of Stone Tour as backup singer for Cher.

1991: appeared in the movie For the Boys.

1991: Love Hurts Tour as backup singer for Cher.

1995–2000: Broadway Musical Smokey Joe's Cafe.

1999–2000: Believe Tour as backup singer for Cher.

2003–2005: Farewell Tour as backup singer for Cher.

Death

On June 16, 2007, Patty's husband found her dead on the floor at their home. He immediately phoned local police, who determined no foul play was involved.  There are rumors that the cause of death was brain aneurysm but there has been no confirmation of that from either the police or the family or reps of Patty's.

References

External links 
 Patty Darcy Jones Obituary (CherWorld)
 Patty Darcy Jones Memorial Page

1953 births
2007 deaths
American women rock singers
American stage actresses
20th-century American singers
20th-century American women singers
21st-century American women